Macrocheilus tripustulatus is a species of ground beetle in the subfamily Anthiinae. It was described by Dejean in 1825.

References

Anthiinae (beetle)
Beetles described in 1825